The 1986 Bristol City Council election took place on 8 May 1986 to elect members of Bristol City Council in England. This was on the same day as other local elections. One third of seats in the 1986 Council Elections in the English city of Bristol were up for election. The election in Brislington West was a by-election. There was a small swing away from the Conservatives and Labour regained a majority on the Council, which they kept until 2003.

Ward results

The change is calculated using the 1983 election results.

Ashley

Avonmouth

Bedminster

Bishopston

Brislington West

Cabot

Clifton

Cotham

Easton

Eastville

Filwood

Frome Vale

Henbury

Henleaze

Hillfields

Horfield

Kingsweston

Lawrence Hill

Lockleaze

Redland

Southmead

Southville

Stoke Bishop

Westbury-on-Trym

Sources
 Bristol Evening Post 9 May 1986

1986
1986 English local elections
1980s in Bristol